Abortion in Indiana was illegal except in cases of rape or incest before 10 weeks post-fertilization, for fatal fetal abnormalities, or to preserve the life and physical health of the mother.
In the wake of the 2022 Dobbs Supreme Court ruling, Indiana outlawed most abortions, with certain exceptions. However, on 22 September 2022, this law was blocked by Special Judge Kelsey B. Hanlon, thus effectively returning the status of legal abortions in Indiana to prior conditions. On January 12, 2023, the Indiana Supreme Court will begin hearings on whether the state's ban on abortion violates its state constitution.

By 1950, the state legislature had tried to pass a law criminalizing women seeking or having abortions. By the early 2000s, the state had passed a law banning abortions after 22 weeks because they alleged that the fetus can feel pain. In 2007, the state had a customary informed consent provision for abortions in place. In 2018, the state legislature tried and failed to make abortion illegal in almost all cases.

The number of abortion clinics in the state has been declining in recent years, going from thirty in 1982 to nineteen in 1992 to nine in 2014. There were 9,765 legal abortions in 2014 and 9,546 in 2015. At least one protest as part of #StopTheBans took place in the state in May 2019. Indiana has also seen violence as a result of anti-abortion rights activities.

According to a poll conducted in late 2022 by the Indiana Public Broadcasting-Ball State Hoosier Survey, more than 80% of Hoosiers believe an abortion ban should have at least some exceptions, and more than 50% say abortion should be legal in most cases. Additionally, around 78% believe that abortion should be legal in cases of rape or incest, and 62% say abortion should be legal if the fetus is likely to be born with severe disabilities or health problems. Moreover, these results remain strong even among Republicans. For example, 67% of Republicans polled said that abortion should be legal in cases of rape or incest; in cases of severe disabilities or health problems, 47% of Republicans polled stated that abortion should be legal. Contrarily, 44% of Republicans polled said that abortion should not be legal in cases of severe disabilities or health problems. The Hoosier Survey polled 600 people in late October 2022 and early November 2022 with a margin of error of plus or minus 4%. The interviews were conducted by telephone (42 by landline and 257 by cell phone) and 301 online.

History

Legal history

Early history
By the end of the 1800s, all states in the Union except Louisiana had therapeutic exceptions in their legislative bans on abortions. In the 19th century, bans by state legislatures on abortion were about protecting the life of the mother given the number of deaths caused by abortions; state governments saw themselves as looking out for the lives of their citizens. By 1950, the state legislature would pass a law that stating that a woman who had an abortion or actively sought to have an abortion regardless of whether she went through with it were guilty of a criminal offense.

Early 2000s developments
The state passed a law in the 2000s banning abortions after 22 weeks based on the theory that this is the point in development after which the fetus can feel pain. The state was one of ten states in 2007 to have a customary informed consent provision for abortions. In 2011, the state was one of six where the legislature introduced a bill that would have banned abortion in almost all cases. It did not pass. In 2013, state Targeted Regulation of Abortion Providers (TRAP) had provisions related to admitting privileges and licensing. They required clinics have hospital privileges or some similar agreement.

The state legislature passed the "Sex Selective and Disability Abortion Ban" in 2016. The bill banned abortions based solely on the fetus's gender, race, ethnicity or detected disability, holding the doctors that perform them liable, and requiring women undergoing abortions to be notified of this 18 hours before the operation. The bill also demanded that aborted fetus be treated as deceased humans, requiring clinics to bury or incinerate the bodies if the woman did not take control of this. The bill was set to go into effect in July 2016, but courts enjoined a permanent injunction against the bill's provisions on the basis these violation the right to an abortion established by Roe v. Wade. The challenge to the injunctions reached the Supreme Court of the United States by May 2019, where the Court's per curiam decision in Box v. Planned Parenthood of Indiana and Kentucky, Inc. reversed the injunction on the fetal disposal aspect, stating that had no impact on a woman's right to an abortion. The Supreme Court did not rule on any merits of the non-discriminator clauses, leaving the permanent injunction in place.

In 2018, the state was one of eleven where the legislature introduced a bill that would have banned abortion in almost all cases but were unsuccessful in passing it. Nationally, 2019 was one of the most active years for state legislatures in terms of trying to pass abortion rights restrictions.  State governments with Republican majorities started to push these bills after Brett M. Kavanaugh was confirmed as a US Supreme Court judge, replacing the more liberal Anthony Kennedy. These state governments generally saw this as a sign that new moves to restrict abortion rights would less likely face resistance by the courts. The Indiana Legislature passed a ban of the most common type of second-trimester abortion procedure in the state in April 2019. As of mid-May 2019, state law banned abortion after week 22.

2020s developments
A 2021 Indiana law requires an ultrasound 18 hours or more before an abortion.

The US Supreme Court's decision in 1973's Roe v. Wade ruling meant the state could no longer regulate abortion in the first trimester.
However, in 2022, the Supreme Court overturned Roe v. Wade in Dobbs v. Jackson Women's Health Organization, .
Indiana passed a law known as "Senate Bill 1" (SB1), which went into effect on September 15, 2022 and banned abortions with exceptions for certain cases of rape, incest, risk to the life of the mother, or fatal fetal anomalies. However, on 22 September 2022, this law was blocked by Special Judge Kelsey B. Hanlon, thus effectively returning the status of legal abortions in Indiana to pre-SB1 conditions.

Clinical history 

Between 1982 and 1992, the number of abortion clinics in the state decreased by eleven, going from 30 in 1982 to 19 in 1992. In 2014, there were nine abortion clinics in the state. In 2014, 95% of the counties in the state did not have an abortion clinic. That year, 66% of women in the state aged 15–44 lived in a county without an abortion clinic. In March 2016, there were 23 Planned Parenthood clinics in the state. In 2017, there were 17 Planned Parenthood clinics, of which 4 offered abortion services, in a state with a population of 1,505,980 women aged 15–49.

For comparison, in 2019, 36% of Indiana's counties had no birth center or hospital where women could give birth, and 17% had no hospital at all.

Statistics 
In 1990, 665,000 women in the state faced the risk of an unintended pregnancy. In 2010, the state had zero publicly funded abortions. In 2013, among white women aged 15–19, there were 720 abortions, 280 abortions for black women aged 15–19, 90 abortions for Hispanic women aged 15–19, and 70 abortions for women of all other races. In 2014, 51% of adults said in a poll by the Pew Research Center that abortion should be illegal vs 43% that believed it should be legal in all or most cases. In 2017, the state had an infant mortality rate of 7.3 deaths per 1,000 live births.

Illegal and unsafe abortion deaths 

Indiana has officially recorded only one illegal abortion death, when, in 1988, a young woman by the name of Becky Bell died from an unsafe abortion rather than discuss her pregnancy and desire for an abortion with her parents. After Bell discovered she was pregnant, she went to a Planned Parenthood clinic in Indiana with her friend Heather Clark, seeking an abortion. There she was told that the law required consent from her parents for the procedure and that most minors in her area simply went to Louisville, less than 100 miles away, to avoid parental disclosure. She also had the option of going before a judge to argue for a waiver of parental consent, but reportedly feared that her parents would find out. Bell was subsequently confused about what to do, according to Clark, alternating between plans to have an abortion in Kentucky, carrying to term and placing the baby for adoption, or running away to California. On a Saturday night in September 1988, Bell left her house, telling her parents that she was going to a party. She came home ill, disheveled, and in tears.  Her illness worsened over the next few days but she would not seek medical attention. Her parents ultimately forced her to see their family physician who diagnosed severe pneumonia and had her hospitalized. She died on September 16, 1988.

Bell's autopsy revealed fetal matter and evidence of infection in her genital tract, but no evidence of internal injury or marks on the cervix. The official cause of death was attributed to septic abortion complicated by pneumonia. The county coroner and pathologist both later told the press that the abortion and infection were most likely caused by the use of unsterile instruments during an illegal abortion procedure. After Bell's death, her parents found among Bell's possessions contact information for abortion clinics in nearby Kentucky, which did not have parental consent laws, but there was no record of her visiting a Kentucky clinic. It remains unclear whether Bell obtained an induced abortion or induced the abortion herself. Two years after her death, Clark, the friend who went to Planned Parenthood with Bell, told reporters that she did not believe that Bell had an induced abortion.

Criminal prosecutions of abortion 
Purvi Patel was sentenced to 20 years in prison in Indiana in March 2015 for allegedly attempting to induce an abortion using medications she had ordered over the Internet. However, her conviction was overturned; if her conviction had not been overturned, she would have been the first woman in the United States to be charged, convicted, and sentenced on a feticide charge.

Abortion rights views and activities

Protests 
#StopTheBans was created in response to six states passing legislation in early 2019 that would almost completely outlaw abortion. Women wanted to protest this activity as other state legislatures started to consider similar bans as part of a move to try to overturn Roe v. Wade. At least one protest as part of #StopTheBans took place in the state.

Anti-abortion views and activities

Violence 
On April 11, 2013, Benjamin David Curell, 27, caused extensive damage to a Planned Parenthood clinic in Bloomington, Indiana, vandalizing it with an axe. Curell was convicted in state court of felony burglary, and pleaded guilty in federal court to one count of violating the Freedom of Access to Clinic Entrances Act. In the federal case, he was sentenced to three years of probation and ordered to pay restitution.

See also 
 2022 pregnancy of a 10-year-old in Ohio

Footnotes

References 

Indiana
Healthcare in Indiana
Women in Indiana